Easthaven railway station served the village of East Haven, Angus, Scotland from 1838 to 1967 on the Dundee and Arbroath Railway.

History 
The station opened on 8 October 1838 by the Dundee and Arbroath Railway. To the west was the goods yard and the signal box, which both closed in 1965. The station closed on 4 September 1967.

References

External links 

Disused railway stations in Angus, Scotland
Former Dundee and Arbroath Railway stations
Railway stations in Great Britain opened in 1838
Railway stations in Great Britain closed in 1967
Beeching closures in Scotland